Roland Winston (born March 12, 1936) is a leading figure in the field of nonimaging optics and its applications to solar energy, and is sometimes termed the "father of non-imaging optics". He is the inventor of the compound parabolic concentrator(CPC), a breakthrough technology in solar energy. He is also a former Guggenheim Fellow, past head of the University of Chicago Department of Physics, a member of the founding faculty of University of California Merced, and as of 2013, head of the California Advanced Solar Technologies Institute.

He holds more than 25 patents, chiefly related to solar energy, and has been figuratively said to have a "patent on the sun".

Early life and education

Winston was born in Moscow, Russia to an American engineer who helped Russians design towns and build an industrial base. In 1942, him and his family had to evacuate Russia when the German military was within artillery range. After fleeing, he attended the Bronx High School of Science. 

Winston enrolled as an early entrant at Shimer College in 1950, transferring to the University of Chicago after two years.  He received a BA from Shimer in 1953, in a graduating class of 11, including future cosmologist Jerome Kristian.  Continuing with advanced undergraduate study at the University of Chicago, he received a BS in 1956.

Winston remained at University of Chicago for his graduate work in physics, completing his MS in 1957 and his Ph.D. in 1963.  He studied under figures including Yoichiro Nambu and Subrahmanyan Chandrasekhar.  Winston's doctoral dissertation was on "observable hyperfine effects in muon capture by complex nuclei."

Scientific career

Winston initially developed the underlying concept of the CPC for use in the study of Cherenkov radiation while working at Argonne National Laboratory in 1966.  He was prompted to invent the CPC several years later in 1974, when Argonne director Robert Sachs asked him if it would be possible to extend the parabolic approach to solar energy applications, and if so, whether it would be superior to the existing systems that used imaging optics.  Only a year after the invention of the CPC, it was discovered that this design had been anticipated by hundreds of millions of years by the eyes of the horseshoe crab. The paper announcing this discovery was also coauthored by Winston.

A key advantage of the CPC over the earlier imaging collectors was that it could achieve very high efficiencies without needing to track the sun.  Non-tracking collectors had previously been believed to be impossible to design.  In addition, CPCs received considerable media attention for their ability to function even under heavily clouded and hazy skies.

Winston and Joseph O'Gallagher devised a more refined version of the CPC in 1982, which was smaller and eliminated the need for an extra layer of glass.

In 1988, using a new mirror-based technique, Winston and his team set a new record for concentration of solar energy, concentrating sunlight to more than 60,000 times its normal intensity.  In 1989, Winston coauthored with W.T. Welford what became the defining text of the field, High Collection Nonimaging Optics.  Later revised under the name of Nonimaging Optics, it remains a classic in the field.

From 1989 to 1995, he served as chair of the Department of Physics of the University of Chicago. In addition to his solar energy work, he has continued to work in his original field of high-energy physics, conducting experiments at Argonne and Fermilab.

In 2003, Winston left the University of Chicago, where he had been working and studying since 1952, to join the founding faculty of the University of California Merced. He has however remained connected the U of C and the city of Chicago, and has remained affiliated with the university's Enrico Fermi Institute. In 2004 he partnered with Chicago company Solargenix Energy to create roof-integrated solar cooling and heating systems. 

On June 13, 2022, Professor Winston announced he would retire on July 1, 2022. Of the first eight founding faculty members, he is the first one to leave after nearly two decades of service to the UC Merced and the University of California system.

Awards and recognition

Winston has received numerous awards in the course of his career, including a Guggenheim Fellowship in 1977 and the Joseph Fraunhofer Award for "significant accomplishments in optical engineering" from the Optical Society of America in 2009.  He was elected as a US delegate to the International Solar Energy Society in 1991.

Devices to which Winston's name has become attached include the CPC itself, which is sometimes known as a "Winston solar collector", and "Winston cones", the individual parabolic elements that make up a CPC.

Writings

Works cited

References

External links
UC Merced faculty profile

Shimer College alumni
University of Chicago alumni
21st-century American physicists
University of Chicago faculty
University of California, Merced faculty
1936 births
Living people
People associated with solar power
Scientists from Chicago